The non-marine molluscs of Madagascar are a part of the molluscan fauna of Madagascar (wildlife of Madagascar).

In tropical rainforests of Madagascar, there is high diversity of species of terrestrial gastropods and many species has low population density, so many of them are "extremely rare".

About 50% of land snails in Madagascar are related to land snails in Africa.

Freshwater gastropods 

Pachychilidae

the genus Madagasikara is endemic to Madagascar, 5 species
 Madagasikara spinosa (Lamarck, 1822) – the previously used name Melanatria fluminea being not valid, endemic
 Madagasikara madagascariensis (Grateloup, 1840) – endemic
 Madagasikara johnsoni (E. A. Smith, 1882) – endemic
 Madagasikara vivipara Köhler & Glaubrecht, 2010 – endemic
 Madagasikara zazavavindrano Köhler & Glaubrecht, 2010 – endemic
 Madagasikara vazimba Köhler & Glaubrecht, 2010 – endemic

Planorbidae – there are 4 species of Bulinus:
 Bulinus bavayi Dautzenberg, 1894 - endemic
 Bulinus forskalii (Ehrenberg, 1831) - introduced
 Bulinus liratus Tristram, 1863 - endemic
 Bulinus obtusispira Smith, 1882 – endemic

Lymnaeidae
 Radix natalensis (Krauss, 1848)

 Land gastropods 

Megalomastomatidae
 Acroptychia mahafinaritra Emberton, Slapcinsky, Campbell, Rakotondrazafy, Andriamiarison & Emberton, 2010
 Acroptychia bathiei Fischer-Piette & Bedoucha, 1965

Cyclophoridae
the genus Boucardicus is endemic to Madagascar, consist 199 species and 5 subspecies
 Boucardicus acutapex Emberton, 2002
 Boucardicus aforitrus Emberton, 2002
 Boucardicus alarus Emberton, 2002
 Boucardicus albocinctus (Smith, 1893)
 Boucardicus ambalaniranae Emberton, 2002
 Boucardicus ambanianae Emberton, 2002
 Boucardicus ambatolahyi Emberton, 2002
 Boucardicus ambatovakiae Emberton, 2002
 Boucardicus ambindaensis Balashov & Griffiths, 2015
 Boucardicus amboinus Emberton, 2002
 Boucardicus ambrensis Emberton, 2002
 Boucardicus ampanefenae Emberton, 2002
 Boucardicus analamerae Emberton, 2002
 Boucardicus andavakoerae Emberton, 2002
 Boucardicus andohahelae Emberton, 2002
 Boucardicus andringitrae Ficher-Piette, Blanc, Blanc & Salvat, 1993
 Boucardicus angavokelensis Fischer-Piette, F. Blanc & Vukadinovic, 1974
 Boucardicus anjanaharibei Emberton, 2002
 Boucardicus anjarae Emberton, Slapcinsky, Campbell, Rakotondrazafy, Andriamiarison & Emberton, 2010
 Boucardicus antiquus Emberton & Pearce, 1999
 Boucardicus avo Emberton, Slapcinsky, Campbell, Rakotondrazafy, Andriamiarison & Emberton, 2010
 Boucardicus beampingaratrae Emberton, 2002
 Boucardicus beananae Fischer-Piette & Bedoucha, 1965
 Boucardicus bedintae Emberton, 2002
 Boucardicus beloakus Emberton, 2002
 Boucardicus bemarahae Emberton, 2002
 Boucardicus bemarahae turbanus Emberton, 2002
 Boucardicus betamponae Emberton, 2002
 Boucardicus betsiakensis Emberton, 2002
 Boucardicus bevavus Emberton, 2002
 Boucardicus bidens Emberton, 2002
 Boucardicus boucheti Fischer-Piette, Blanc, Blanc & Salvat, 1993
 Boucardicus boulangeri Fischer-Piette, Blanc, Blanc & Salvat, 1993
 Boucardicus cadlei Emberton, 2002
 Boucardicus capsaintemariae Emberton, 2002
 Boucardicus carilockneyae Emberton, 2002
 Boucardicus carylae Emberton & Pearce, 1999
 Boucardicus castaneus Emberton, 2002
 Boucardicus celesti Emberton, 2002
 Boucardicus celestinae Emberton, 2002
 Boucardicus clarae Emberton, 1994
 Boucardicus claudei Emberton, 2002
 Boucardicus coffeus Emberton, 2002
 Boucardicus compactus Emberton, 2002
 Boucardicus corrugatus Emberton, 2002
 Boucardicus costulatus Emberton, 2002
 Boucardicus culminans Fischer-Piette, Blanc, Blanc & Salvat, 1993
 Boucardicus curvifolius Emberton & Pearce, 1999
 Boucardicus darasyi Emberton, 2002
 Boucardicus delicatus Emberton & Pearce, 1999
 Boucardicus distortus Emberton, 2002
 Boucardicus divei Fischer-Piette, Blanc, Blanc & Salvat, 1993
 Boucardicus dominiqui Emberton, 2002
 Boucardicus elegans Emberton, 2002
 Boucardicus esetrae Emberton & Pearce, 1999
 Boucardicus fauri (Fischer-Piette, Blanc, Blanc & Salvat, 1993)
 Boucardicus fidimananai Emberton & Pearce, 1999
 Boucardicus fischerpiettei  Emberton, 2002
 Boucardicus florenti Emberton, 2002
 Boucardicus fofifae Emberton, 2002
 Boucardicus fortistriatus Emberton & Pearce, 1999
 Boucardicus fotsivavus Emberton, 2002
 Boucardicus fuscolabrus Emberton, 1994
 Boucardicus gibberosus (Fischer-Piette, Blanc, Blanc & Salvat, 1993)
 Boucardicus globulus Emberton, 2002
 Boucardicus gloriosus Emberton, 2002
 Boucardicus goodmani Emberton, 2002
 Boucardicus goudoti (Fischer-Piette & Bedoucha, 1965)
 Boucardicus gratus Emberton, 2002
 Boucardicus griffithsi Emberton, 2002
 Boucardicus hadgii Fischer-Piette, Blanc, Blanc & Salvat, 1993
 Boucardicus hafahafus Emberton, 2002
 Boucardicus hamafasinus Emberton, 2002
 Boucardicus harananae Emberton, 1994
 Boucardicus hautspiralus Emberton, 2002
 Boucardicus hetra Emberton, Slapcinsky, Campbell, Rakotondrazafy, Andriamiarison & Emberton, 2010
 Boucardicus hitus Emberton, 2002
 Boucardicus inconspicuus Emberton, 2002
 Boucardicus inornatus Emberton, 2002
 Boucardicus josephinae Emberton, 2002
 Boucardicus kanto Emberton, 2002
 Boucardicus kianjavatoae Emberton, 2002
 Boucardicus kikarivoi Emberton, 2002
 Boucardicus kremenae Emberton, 2002
 Boucardicus kristalius Emberton, 2002
 Boucardicus kylei (Emberton, 1994)
 Boucardicus lalinify Emberton, Slapcinsky, Campbell, Rakotondrazafy, Andriamiarison & Emberton, 2010
 Boucardicus lalitrus Emberton, 2002
 Boucardicus laoranjus Emberton, 2002
 Boucardicus lavakelius Emberton, 2002
 Boucardicus lavalavus Emberton, 2002
 Boucardicus lavalavus andaitrae Emberton, 2002
 Boucardicus lavalavus toilavalavus Emberton, 2002
 Boucardicus lavalavus zobikeliae Emberton, 2002
 Boucardicus lelus Emberton, 2002 
 Boucardicus leopardus Emberton, 2002
 Boucardicus littoralis Emberton, 2002
 Boucardicus luciae Emberton, 1994
 Boucardicus mageti Fischer-Piette, Blanc, Blanc & Salvat, 1993
 Boucardicus magnilobatus Emberton & Pearce, 1999
 Boucardicus mahafinaritrus Emberton, 2002
 Boucardicus mahalevonae Emberton, 2002
 Boucardicus mahavariana Emberton, Slapcinsky, Campbell, Rakotondrazafy, Andriamiarison & Emberton, 2010
 Boucardicus mahermanae Emberton & Pearce, 1999
 Boucardicus malemius Emberton, 2002
 Boucardicus malotus Emberton, 2002
 Boucardicus mamirapiratrus Emberton, 2002
 Boucardicus mananarae Emberton, 2002
 Boucardicus manantenus Emberton, 2002
 Boucardicus mandenae Emberton, 2002
 Boucardicus manjakely Emberton, 2002
 Boucardicus manomboensis Emberton, 2002
 Boucardicus manomponae Emberton, 2002
 Boucardicus marojejiae Emberton, 2002
 Boucardicus maronifius Emberton, 2002
 Boucardicus matoatoa Emberton, Slapcinsky, Campbell, Rakotondrazafy, Andriamiarison & Emberton, 2010
 Boucardicus mavokely Emberton, 2002
 Boucardicus menoi Emberton, Slapcinsky, Campbell, Rakotondrazafy, Andriamiarison & Emberton, 2010
 Boucardicus meyersi Emberton, 2002
 Boucardicus michellae Emberton, 2002
 Boucardicus microlavalavus Emberton, 2002
 Boucardicus microtridentatus Emberton, 2002
 Boucardicus mihomehius Emberton, 2002
 Boucardicus mijerius Emberton, 2002
 Boucardicus milloti Fischer-Piette & Bedoucha, 1965
 Boucardicus minicompactus Emberton, 2002
 Boucardicus minisimplex Emberton, 2002
 Boucardicus minutus Emberton, 2002
 Boucardicus mitovytovylavalavus Emberton, 2002 
 Boucardicus monchenkoi Balashov & Griffiths, 2015
 Boucardicus moronarous Emberton, 2002
 Boucardicus nanus Fischer-Piette & Bedoucha, 1965
 Boucardicus nifimenius Emberton, 2002
 Boucardicus nifius Emberton, 2002
 Boucardicus nosymangabei Emberton, 2002
 Boucardicus notabilis (Smith, 1892)
 Boucardicus onjus Emberton, 2002
 Boucardicus optio Fischer-Piette, Blanc, Blanc & Salvat, 1993
 Boucardicus pachychilus Emberton, 1994
 Boucardicus paradelicatus Emberton, 2002
 Boucardicus parantiquus Emberton, 2002
 Boucardicus paratridentatus Emberton, 2002
 Boucardicus peggyae Emberton, Slapcinsky, Campbell, Rakotondrazafy, Andriamiarison & Emberton, 2010
 Boucardicus pendulus Emberton, 2002
 Boucardicus perineti Emberton, 2002
 Boucardicus petiti Fischer-Piette & Bedoucha, 1965
 Boucardicus pseudocompactus Emberton, 2002 
 Boucardicus pseudogastrocoptus Emberton, 2002
 Boucardicus pseudomphalotropis Emberton, 2002
 Boucardicus pulchellus Emberton, Slapcinsky, Campbell, Rakotondrazafy, Andriamiarison & Emberton, 2010
 Boucardicus pupillidentatus Emberton, 2002
 Boucardicus pupisomus Emberton, 1994
 Boucardicus rakotoarisoni Emberton & Pearce, 1999
 Boucardicus randalanai Emberton & Pearce, 1999
 Boucardicus ranomafanae Emberton, 1994
 Boucardicus regularis Emberton, 2002
 Boucardicus reservei Emberton, 2002
 Boucardicus reticulatus Emberton, 2002
 Boucardicus roamolotrus Emberton, 2002
 Boucardicus ronae Emberton, 2002
 Boucardicus ruthae Emberton, 2002
 Boucardicus sahasoae Emberton, 2002
 Boucardicus sahavondrononae Emberton, 2002
 Boucardicus saintemariae Emberton, 2002
 Boucardicus saintjacqui Emberton, 2002
 Boucardicus saintlouisi Emberton, 2002
 Boucardicus sculptus Emberton, 2002
 Boucardicus seguini Fischer-Piette, Blanc, Blanc & Salvat, 1993
 Boucardicus simplex Emberton & Pearce, 1999
 Boucardicus solidus Emberton, 2002
 Boucardicus soulaianus Fischer-Piette, Blanc, Blanc & Salvat, 1993
 Boucardicus streptaxis Emberton, 2002
 Boucardicus striatus Emberton, 2002
 Boucardicus tandrimus Emberton, 2002
 Boucardicus tantelyae Emberton, Slapcinsky, Campbell, Rakotondrazafy, Andriamiarison & Emberton, 2010
 Boucardicus timpearcei Emberton, 2002
 Boucardicus tolagnaroi Emberton, 2002
 Boucardicus trafous Emberton, 2002
 Boucardicus triangulus Emberton, 2002
 Boucardicus tridentatus Emberton & Pearce, 1999
 Boucardicus trompettus Emberton, 2002
 Boucardicus tsarabeus Emberton, 2002
 Boucardicus tsaratananae Emberton, 2002
 Boucardicus tsingyi Emberton, 2002
 Boucardicus vagneri Fischer-Piette, Blanc, Blanc & Salvat, 1993
 Boucardicus vagneri galokoae Emberton, 2002
 Boucardicus vagneri tsaratae Emberton, 2002
 Boucardicus vavabitikus Emberton, 2002
 Boucardicus victorhernandezi Emberton 1998
 Boucardicus villae (Fischer-Piette, Blanc, Blanc & Salvat, 1993)
 Boucardicus vincenti Emberton, 2002
 Boucardicus volamenus Emberton, 2002
 Boucardicus volous Emberton, 2002
 Boucardicus zebreus Emberton, 2002
 Cyathopoma anjombona Emberton, Slapcinsky, Campbell, Rakotondrazafy, Andriamiarison & Emberton, 2010
 Cyathopoma hoditra Emberton, Slapcinsky, Campbell, Rakotondrazafy, Andriamiarison & Emberton, 2010
 Cyathopoma iridescens Emberton, Slapcinsky, Campbell, Rakotondrazafy, Andriamiarison & Emberton, 2010
 Cyathopoma madio Emberton, Slapcinsky, Campbell, Rakotondrazafy, Andriamiarison & Emberton, 2010
 Cyathopoma matsoko Emberton, Slapcinsky, Campbell, Rakotondrazafy, Andriamiarison & Emberton, 2010
 Cyclotus (Millotorbis) ankaranae Emberton, 2004
 Cyclotus bemarahae Emberton, 2004
 Cyclotus gallorum Emberton, 2004
 Cyclotus griffithsi Emberton, 2004
 Cyclotus mamillaris Odhner, 1919
 Cyclotus micromamillaris Emberton, 2004
 Cyclotus (Millotorbis) milloti Fischer-Piette & Bedoucha, 1965
 Cyclotus namorokae Emberton, 2004

Assimineidae
 Omphalotropis angulata Emberton, 2004
 Omphalotropis betamponae Emberton, 2004
 Omphalotropis bevohimenae Emberton, 2004
 Omphalotropis capdambrae Emberton, 2004
 Omphalotropis castelli Fischer-Piette, Blanc, Blanc & Salvat, 1993
 Omphalotropis costulata Emberton & Pearce, 1999
 Omphalotropis fortis Emberton, 2004
 Omphalotropis galokoae Emberton, 2004
 Omphalotropis griffithsi Emberton, 2004
 Omphalotropis madagascariensis Germain, 1921
 Omphalotropis manomboae Emberton, 2004
 Omphalotropis tantelia Emberton, 2004
 Omphalotropis vohimenae Emberton & Pearce, 1999

Hydrocenidae
 Georissa ampla Emberton, 2004
 Georissa ankaranae Emberton, 2004
 Georissa aurata (Odhner, 1919)
 Georissa capdambrae Emberton, 2004
 Georissa detrita Bavay & Germain, 1920
 Georissa froli Fischer-Piette, Blanc, Blanc & Salvat, 1993
 Georissa krantz Fischer-Piette, Blanc, Blanc & Salvat, 1993
 Georissa maraoraoa Emberton, 2004
 Georissa petiti Germain, 1935
 Georissa saintemariae Emberton, 2004
 Georissa verreti Fischer-Piette, Blanc, Blanc & Salvat, 1993

Pomatiidae
 Tropidophora humbug Griffiths & Herbert, 2013
 Tropidophora sericea Griffiths & Herbert, 2013

Veronicellidae
 a veronicellid sp. or spp.

Orculidae
 Fauxulus josephinae Emberton & Griffiths, 2009
 Fauxulus tsarakely Emberton, Slapcinsky, Campbell, Rakotondrazafy, Andriamiarison & Emberton, 2010

Succineidae
 Succinea masoala Emberton & Griffiths, 2009

Subulinidae

 Allopeas sp. 1 sensu Emberton & Griffiths (2009)
 Allopeas sp. 2 sensu Emberton & Griffiths (2009)
 Curvella poutiersi Fischer-Piette, Blanc, Blanc & Salvat, 1994
 Pseudopeas cf. valentini Fischer-Piette, Blanc, Blanc & Salvat, 1994
 Subulina mamillata (Craven, 1880)
 Subulina octona (Bruguière, 1792)

Cerastidae
 Conulinus randalanai Griffiths & Herbert, 2013

Achatinidae
 Achatina fulica Bowdich, 1822
 Achatina immaculata Lamarck, 1822

Streptaxidae
 Fischerpietteus josephinae Emberton & Griffiths, 2009
 Gulella ambodipelomosiae Emberton, 2002
 Gulella andriantanteliae Emberton, Slapcinsky, Campbell, Rakotondrazafy, Andriamiarison & Emberton, 2010
 Gulella beandreana Emberton, 2001
 Gulella betamponae Emberton, 2002
 Gulella kelimolotra Emberton, 2002
 Gulella kendrae Emberton & Griffiths, 2009
 Gulella laninifia Emberton, 2002
 Gulella lincolni Emberton & Griffiths, 2009
 Gulella matavymolotra Emberton, 2002
 Gulella minuseula Emberton & Pearce, 2000
 Gulella ruthae Emberton, 2002
 Gulella sahia Emberton, 2002
 Gulella soulaiana Fischer-Piette, 1973
 Gulella taolantehezana Emberton, 2002
 Gulella thompsoni Emberton, Slapcinsky, Campbell, Rakotondrazafy, Andriamiarison & Emberton, 2010
 Gulella sp. 1 sensu Emberton & Griffiths (2009)
 Gulella sp. 2 sensu Emberton & Griffiths (2009)
 Gulella sp. 3 sensu Emberton & Griffiths (2009)

 Parvedentulina Emberton & Pearce, 2000 – Parvedentulina are endemic to Madagascar
 Parvedentulina acutapex Emberton & Pearce, 2000
 Parvedentulina ambatomitatoae Emberton, 2002
 Parvedentulina ambatosorotrae Emberton, 2002
 Parvedentulina ambatovakiae Emberton, 2002
 Parvedentulina analamerae Emberton, 2002
 Parvedentulina andapae Emberton, 2002
 Parvedentulina andavakoerae Emberton, 2002
 Parvedentulina andriantanteliae Emberton, Slapcinsky, Campbell, Rakotondrazafy, Andriamiarison & Emberton, 2010
 Parvedentulina andringitrae Emberton, 2002
 Parvedentulina anjanaharibei Emberton, 2002
 Parvedentulina anjansudae Emberton, 2002
 Parvedentulina antsahamadioae Emberton, 2002
 Parvedentulina apieostriata Emberton & Pearce, 2000
 Parvedentulina balambasia Emberton, 2002
 Parvedentulina bemarahae Emberton, 2002
 Parvedentulina benjamini Emberton, Slapcinsky, Campbell, Rakotondrazafy, Andriamiarison & Emberton, 2010
 Parvedentulina betamponae Emberton, 2002
 Parvedentulina betsiakae Emberton, 2002
 Parvedentulina celestinae Emberton, 2002
 Parvedentulina conspicua Emberton, 2002
 Parvedentulina crenulata Emberton, 2002
 Parvedentulina delicata Emberton, 2002
 Parvedentulina densagyra Emberton, 2002
 Parvedentulina devolia Emberton, 2002
 Parvedentulina distincta Emberton, 2002
 Parvedentulina elegans Emberton, 2002
 Parvedentulina -setra Emberton & Pearce, 2000
 Parvedentulina farihiambonia Emberton, 2002
 Parvedentulina fenni Emberton, 2002
 Parvedentulina fortistriata Emberton, 2002
 Parvedentulina fotobohitrae Emberton, 2002
 Parvedentulina fragilis Emberton, 2002
 Parvedentulina fusiforma Emberton, 2002
 Parvedentulina gle.si (Fischer-Piette, Blanc, Blanc & Salvat, 1994)
 Parvedentulina gracilis Emberton, 2002
 Parvedentulina hafa Emberton, 2002
 Parvedentulina hatairana Emberton, 2002
 Parvedentulina horonanladia Emberton, 2002
 Parvedentulina jeani Emberton, Slapcinsky, Campbell, Rakotondrazafy, Andriamiarison & Emberton, 2010
 Parvedentulina josephinae Emberton, 2002
 Parvedentulina kelivitsika Emberton, 2002
 Parvedentulina lalina Emberton, 2002
 Parvedentulina macroconspicua Emberton, 2002
 Parvedentulina magna Emberton, 2002
 Parvedentulina mahalevona Emberton, 2002
 Parvedentulina mahialambo-ensis Emberton & Pearce, 2000
 Parvedentulina mahitsia Emberton, 2002
 Parvedentulina malala Emberton, 2002
 Parvedentulina mamirapiratra Emberton, 2002
 Parvedentulina mananarae Emberton, 2002
 Parvedentulina mandenae Emberton, 2002
 Parvedentulina manja Emberton, 2002
 Parvedentulina manomboae Emberton, 2002
 Parvedentulina manomponae Emberton, 2002
 Parvedentulina maranitra Emberton, 2002
 Parvedentulina margostriata Emberton & Pearce, 2000
 Parvedentulina marojejyae Emberton, 2002
 Parvedentulina masoalae Emberton, 2002
 Parvedentulina metula (Crosse, 1881)
 Parvedentulina miaranoniae Emberton, 2002
 Parvedentulina mijanona Emberton, 2002
 Parvedentulina minidistincta Emberton, 2002
 Parvedentulina minutissima Emberton, 2002
 Parvedentulina montana Emberton, 2002
 Parvedentulina morontsiraka Emberton, 2002
 Parvedentulina namoro-kae Emberton, 2002
 Parvedentulina ovatostoma Emberton & Pearce, 2000
 Parvedentulina parva Emberton, 2002
 Parvedentulina pascali Emberton, 2002
 Parvedentulina paulayi Emberton, Slapcinsky, Campbell, Rakotondrazafy, Andriamiarison & Emberton, 2010
 Parvedentulina pearcei Emberton, 2002
 Parvedentulina planapex Emberton, 2002
 Parvedentulina puichella Emberton, 2002
 Parvedentulina pyramida Emberton, 2002
 Parvedentulina ranomafanae Emberton, 2002
 Parvedentulina rantovina Emberton, 2002
 Parvedentulina rapetoa Emberton, 2002
 Parvedentulina ravinamatia Emberton, 2002
 Parvedentulina rogeri Emberton & Pearce, 2000
 Parvedentulina sahantananae Emberton, 2002
 Parvedentulina saintjacqui Emberton, 2002
 Parvedentulina simeni (Fischer-Piette, Blanc, Blanc & Salvat, 1994)
 Parvedentulina simplex Emberton, 2002
 Parvedentulina tendrombohitra Emberton, 2002
 Parvedentulina terakabe Emberton, 2002
 Parvedentulina texieri Emberton, 2002
 Parvedentulina thompsoni Emberton, Slapcinsky, Campbell, Rakotondrazafy, Andriamiarison & Emberton, 2010
 Parvedentulina tsara Emberton, 2002
 Parvedentulina tsaratananae Emberton, 2002
 Parvedentulina tsaravintana Emberton, 2002
 Parvedentulina tsimahialamboensis Emberton, 2002
 Parvedentulina tsingia Emberton, 2002
 Parvedentulina tsipika Emberton, 2002
 Parvedentulina tsisubulina Emberton, 2002
 Parvedentulina tsotra Emberton, 2002
 Parvedentulina unescoae Emberton, 2002
 Parvedentulina vavalava Emberton, 2002
 Parvedentulina vitroni (Fischer-Piette, Blanc, Blanc & Salvat, 1994)
 Parvedentulina vonjena Emberton, 2002

Acavidae
 Ampelita ambatoensis Emberton & Griffiths, 2009
 Ampelita andriamamonjyi Griffiths & Herbert, 2013
 Ampelita beanka Griffiths & Herbert, 2013
 Ampelita julii Fischer-Piette & Garreau, 1965Emberton K. C. (1996). Ampelita julii. 2006 IUCN Red List of Threatened Species. Downloaded on 6 August 2007. – Ampelita julii soa Emberton & Griffiths, 2009
 Ampelita lamarei (Pfeiffer, 1853)
 Ampelita owengriffithsi Emberton, Slapcinsky, Campbell, Rakotondrazafy, Andriamiarison & Emberton, 2010
 Clavator moreleti Crosse & Fischer, 1868 / Clavator moreleti (Deshayes in Férussac, 1851)
 Helicophanta amphibulima (Férussac, 1839)

Charopidae
 Reticulapex michellae Emberton, Slapcinsky, Campbell, Rakotondrazafy, Andriamiarison & Emberton, 2010

Ariophantidae
 Kalidos gora Emberton, Slapcinsky, Campbell, Rakotondrazafy, Andriamiarison & Emberton, 2010
 Kalidos manotrika Emberton, Slapcinsky, Campbell, Rakotondrazafy, Andriamiarison & Emberton, 2010
 Kalidos manta Emberton, Slapcinsky, Campbell, Rakotondrazafy, Andriamiarison & Emberton, 2010
 Kalidos maryannae Griffiths & Herbert, 2013

Helicarionidae
 Kaliella crandalli Emberton, Slapcinsky, Campbell, Rakotondrazafy, Andriamiarison & Emberton, 2010
 Microcystis albosuturalis Emberton, Slapcinsky, Campbell, Rakotondrazafy, Andriamiarison & Emberton, 2010
 Microcystis fotsifotsy Emberton, Slapcinsky, Campbell, Rakotondrazafy, Andriamiarison & Emberton, 2010
 Microcystis vony Emberton, Slapcinsky, Campbell, Rakotondrazafy, Andriamiarison & Emberton, 2010
 Sitala burchi Emberton, Slapcinsky, Campbell, Rakotondrazafy, Andriamiarison & Emberton, 2010
 Sitala mavo Emberton, Slapcinsky, Campbell, Rakotondrazafy, Andriamiarison & Emberton, 2010
 Sitala stanisici Emberton, Slapcinsky, Campbell, Rakotondrazafy, Andriamiarison & Emberton, 2010

Freshwater bivalves

Sphaeriidae

 Eupera ferruginea (Krauss, 1848)
 Pisidium reticulatum Kuiper, 1966)

See also
 List of marine molluscs of Madagascar
 List of non-marine molluscs of Mozambique
 List of non-marine molluscs of Mauritius
 List of non-marine molluscs of Mayotte

References

External links
 
 Smith E. A. (1882). "A contribution to the Molluscan fauna of Madagascar". Proceedings of the Zoological Society of London 1882: 375–390.
 Van Damme D., Köehler F., Andriamaro L., Darwall W. & Máiz-Tomé L. (2018). The status and distribution of freshwater molluscs. pp. 29–41. In: Máiz-Tomé L., Sayer C. & Darwall W. (eds) (2018). Chapter 4. The status and distribution of freshwater biodiversity in Madagascar and the Indian Ocean islands hotspot''. Gland, Switzerland: IUCN. viii+128 pp. . PDF.

 Molluscs, Non Marine
Molluscs
Madagascar
Madagascar